Rainier Motor Car Company was an American automobile manufacturer founded in 1905 by John T. Rainier in Flushing, New York and from 1908 produced in Saginaw, Michigan. The company specialized in manufacturing large and luxurious automobiles.  In 1909, the company was bought by General Motors who maintained the brand until 1911.

History
Rainiers were big, conventional and solidly built powerful automobiles. They earned local success with hill climbs and mountain races. The company was also one of the first who offered a limited one-year guarantee on "use without repair expenses".

They were first headquartered in John Rainier's dealership for Vehicle Equipment (V .E.) Automobiles. James G. Heaslet became chief engineer for Rainier, a position which he held for the whole time of production.

Rainiers received their final assembly in Flushing. Chassis were delivered by the Garford Company of Elyria, Ohio which specialized in automobile components and built chassis for several car manufacturers, most prominently Studebaker.

During 1907 it became obvious that Garford and Studebaker would intensify their cooperation and that delivery of frames for Rainier was not secure. Rainier decided to build its cars completely in-house. A new plant was erected in Saginaw, Michigan which already was considered an early center of automobile manufacturing. It opened in time for the production of 1908 models.

Rainier during the Panic of 1907 was hit by a cash shortage.  After the assembly of 300 automobiles in Saginaw, Rainier was petitioned into involuntary bankruptcy because as General Manager Paul Lineberger explained, there was not enough cash to meet wages and material cost, even though assets were in excess of liabilities. The company was auctioned on January 25, 1909 and went for $20,000 to attorney George C. Comstock who represented John Rainier. John Rainer could not raise the money to save his business, and William C. Durant bought it from Comstock for General Motors.

GM organized the Marquette Motor Company in Saginaw to manufacture the Rainier and parts for the other recently acquired luxury car, the Welch Motor Car Company and it's less expensive companion make, the Welch-Detroit.  Marquette business was under the control of GM's Buick Motor Company management.  In September, 1910, Durant had to leave GM after financial trouble arose after his aggressive policy of acquisitions of many companies.

GM management practiced a course of consolidation which led to the demise of several makes including the Welch. The Rainer automobile was produced until 1911, then production of the Welch-Detroit, was transferred from Pontiac, Michigan to Rainier's Saginaw factory.

For 1912 a last attempt was tried by developing new models that used parts of both the Welch-Detroit Model S, 45/50 HP, and the Rainier Model F, 50 HP. They were marketed as the Marquette 40 HP and 45 HP, respectively, and sold for prices that started at $3,000 and $4,000. The very last cars were then offered as Peninsular, but production ceased at the end of 1912.

GM would use the brand name Marquette again for a junior Buick automobile in 1930, and would use the "Rainier" name on the rebranded Oldsmobile Bravada/Buick Rainier when Oldsmobile was discontinued in 2003.

John T. Rainier set up the Rainier Motor Truck Company in New York City soon after he returned from Saginaw in 1910.  The Rainier Motor Corporation was organized in 1916 and moved back to Flushing in 1917.  Rainier trucks were produced until 1927.

Gallery

Model overview

External links 
 1907 Rainier Model C at Stahls Automotive Collection
 1908 Rainier Model E sold by Bonhams
 Detroit Public Library - Rainier Motor car images

References

General Motors marques
Former General Motors subsidiaries
American companies established in 1905
American companies disestablished in 1911
1905 establishments in New York City
1911 disestablishments in New York (state)
Motor vehicle manufacturers based in Michigan
Motor vehicle manufacturers based in New York (state)
Defunct motor vehicle manufacturers of the United States
Defunct manufacturing companies based in New York City
Vehicle manufacturing companies established in 1905
Vehicle manufacturing companies disestablished in 1911
Luxury motor vehicle manufacturers
Luxury vehicles
Brass Era vehicles
1900s cars
1910s cars
Cars introduced in 1905